

North America

Canada
Generally referred to as Aboriginal peoples in Canada when looking at the First Nations, Inuit, and Métis peoples collectively.

Greenland

Mexico

This issue is complicated because a great majority of Mexicans are mestizos and therefore being part Native is not unusual as in Canada or the US. The list only include indigenous proper and mestizos with an indigenous parent. This list also includes a few Pre-Columbian figures considered remarkable in the history and culture of Mexico.

Ignacio Manuel Altamirano, writer, journalist and politician (Nahua)
Fernando de Alva Cortés Ixtlilxóchitl, (d. 1648) Nahua historian, descendant of Ixtlilxochitl
Bartolomé de Alva, Nahua, younger brother of Fernando de Alva Cortés Ixtlilxóchitl
Diego de Alvarado Huanitzin, tlatoani of Tenochtitlan
Domingo Arenas, Mexican revolutionary from Tlaxcala
Juan Badiano, Nahua translator 
Juana Belén Gutiérrez de Mendoza, anarchist, feminist activist, typographer, journalist and poet (Caxcan)
Cajemé, Yaqui rebel leader
Jacinto Canek (1731-1761), Maya rebel leader
Chimalpahin (1579-1660), Nahua historian
Cuauhtémoc, last (Aztec) Tlatoani
Cuitláhuac, penultimate (Aztec) Tlatoani
Juan Diego Cuauhtlatoatzin, Catholic Saint (Chichimeca)
Porfirio Díaz, President (Mixtec mother)
Pascual Díaz y Barreto (1876-1936), Huichol Roman Catholic prelate
Lila Downs, singer (Mixtec mother)
Emilio Fernández, film director, actor (Kickapoo mother)
Faustino Galicia Chimalpopoca professor, lawyer, and translator of the Nahuatl language. 
Natalio Hernández (b. 1947) Nahua poet from Veracruz
Victoriano Huerta, President (Huichol mother)
Indio Mariano, rebel leader in Tepic
Luz Jiménez (1897-1965), Nahua storyteller
Benito Juárez, President (Zapotec)
La Malinche, translator of conquistador Hernán Cortés
Modesta Lavana, (1929-2010), Nahua healer
Florentina López de Jesús (1939-2014), Amuzgo weaver
Tomás Mejía, Otomi Mexican Army general
Moctezuma II, (Aztec) Tlatoani at the beginning of the Spanish Conquest of the Aztec Empire
Diego Muñoz Camargo (c. 1529-1599), historian of Tlaxcala
Nezahualcóyotl, Tlatoani of Texcoco and poet in Nahuatl language
Nezahualpilli (1464-1515), Tlatoani of Texcoco
Martín Ocelotl (1496-?1537), Nahua priest/shaman executed by the Inquisition
Carlos Ometochtzin (d. 1539) Cacique of Texcoco, executed by the Inquisition
Daniel Ponce de León (b. 1980) Tarahumara professional boxer
Comandante Ramona, EZLN leader (Tzotzil)
Isabel Ramírez Castaneda (1881-1943), (Nahua) archeologist
María Sabina, shaman (Mazatec)
Comandante Tacho, EZLN leader (Tojolabal)
Refugio Tánori, Opata commander and supporter of the Second Mexican Empire.
Francisco Tenamaztle (fl. 1540s-50s) Caxcan leader in the Mixton War
Antonio Valeriano (c. 1521-1605), Nahua scholar, collaborator with Bernardino de Sahagún on the Florentine Codex
Felipe Santiago Xicoténcatl, 1804-1847 Nahua, general in the Mexican Army under Antonio López de Santa Anna

United States

Central America

The Caribbean
 Agüeybaná (The Great Sun) - "supreme cacique" in Puerto Rico
Agüeybaná II - Cacique in Puerto Rico
 Arasibo - Cacique in Puerto Rico
Hatuey (Taíno), Cacique in Cuba
 Hayuya - Cacique in Puerto Rico
 Jumacao - Cacique in Puerto Rico
 Anacaona - Cacique in Hispaniola (Taíno)
 Arawak - Cacique in Bahamas (Taíno)
 Caonabo - Cacique in Hispaniola (Carib)
 Guacanagaric - Cacique in Hispaniola (Taíno)
 Guarionex - Cacique in Hispaniola (Taíno)
 Cotubanama - Cacique in Hispaniola (Taíno)
 Enriquillo - Cacique in Hispaniola (Taíno)

Guatemala
Miguel Ángel Asturias, novelist, Nobel prize winner in literature
Rigoberta Menchú Tum, activist, Nobel prize winner in peace (Quiché)
Concepción Ramírez, activist, appears on the Guatemalan 25-centavo coin

Nicaragua
Myrna Cunningham, Miskita physician, feminist and indigenous rights activist

South America

Bolivia
Roberto Mamani Mamani (b. 1962), Aymara painter
Alejandro Mario Yllanes (1913–1960), Aymara painter and printmaker
Evo Morales, Aymara politician, president of Bolivia
Bienvenido Zacu Mborobainchi, b. 1956, Guarayo politician

Brazil
 Daniel Munduruku
 Bebeto

Chile
Ainavillo (16th-century), Mapuche toqui
Butapichón (17th-century), Mapuche toqui
Cadeguala (16th-century), Mapuche toqui
Calfucurá (late 1770s–1873), Mapuche military leader from Patagonia
Caupolicán (died 1558), Mapuche toqui
Santos Chávez (1934–2001), Mapuche printmaker
Elicura Chihuailaf (born 1952), Mapuche poet

Colombia
Quintín Lame (1880–1967), Paez political leader and author

Ecuador
Camilo Egas, Mestizo, painter and educator, 1889–1962
Eugenio Espejo, Mestizo journalist, hygienist, lawyer, and satirical writer, 1747–1795
Oswaldo Guayasamín, Quechua painter and sculptor, 1919–1999
Eduardo Kingman, Mestizo painter, 1913–1998
Luis Macas, Quechua anthropologist and politician, born 1951
Mincaye, Hauo preacher and church elder, born 1935
Nina Pacari, Kichwa politician, lawyer and indigenous leader from Cotacachi, born 1961
Antonio Vargas, Quechua politician

Peru
Tupac Amaru, military figure and last Inca
Túpac Amaru II (1738-1781), leader of massive Andean uprising against Spanish colonial rule
Túpac Katari (c. 1750-1781), leader of an Andean uprising
Inca Garcilaso de la Vega, writer
Yma Sumac, Singer of self-identified Inca ancestry
Alejandro Toledo, President
Marcos Zapata (c. 1710–1773), Quechua Cuzco School painter
Magaly Solier, Quechua actress
Manco Cápac, Sapa Inca 
Ollanta Humala, President of Peru
Q'orianka Kilcher, Quechua actress
Martín Chambi, Quechua photographer
Diego Quispe Tito, Quechua painter

See also

List of indigenous artists of the Americas
List of writers from peoples indigenous to the Americas

Notes

Indigenous
Indigenous people of the Americas
Indigenous people of the Americas